Warren James Jewellers is a British jeweller.

The company is owned and managed by the brother and sister that founded it with the first shop in Denton, Stockport in 1979. Since then they have grown to 225 shops nationwide and become the largest independent jewellers in the United Kingdom.

References 

Info on website

External links
Official Site

Jewellery retailers of the United Kingdom
British companies established in 1979
Retail companies established in 1979